I Don't Want to Lose You Baby is the fourth studio album by the English duo Chad & Jeremy. It was released on September 27, 1965. I Don't Want to Lose You Baby was recorded from February 1, 1965 to June 24, 1965. "I Have Dreamed" was released as a single and backed with "Should I". "I Don't Want to Lose You Baby" was also released as a single, and backed with "Pennies", not included on the album.

Track listing
"I Don't Want to Lose You Baby" (Van McCoy) – 2:51
"Should I" (Chad Stuart, Jeremy Clyde) – 2:51
"The Girl Who Sang the Blues" (Barry Mann, Cythnia Weil) – 2:16
"Funny How Love Can Be" (Kenneth Hawker, John Shakespeare) – 1:50
"The Woman in You" (Jeremy Clyde) – 2:34
"Mr. Tambourine Man" (Bob Dylan) – 2:25
"I Have Dreamed" (Richard Rodgers, Oscar Hammerstein II) – 2:11
"Don't Think Twice, It's All Right" (Bob Dylan)– 3:09
"Baby Don't Go" (Sonny Bono) - 3:10
"There but for Fortune" (Phil Ochs) – 3:14
"These Things You Don't Forget" (Van McCoy) - 2:25

References

Chad & Jeremy albums
1965 albums